Cornelia Aletta van Hulst (19 January 1797 – 7 November 1870) was a Dutch painter.

Cornelia Aletta van Hulst was born, lived and worked all her life in Amsterdam. She was taught by her grandfather Jurriaan Andriessen and uncle Christiaan Andriessen. She worked often making copies of other artists' works. She primarily painted landscapes. She died on 7 November 1870.

References

1797 births
1870 deaths
19th-century Dutch painters
Painters from Amsterdam
19th-century Dutch women artists
Dutch women painters